Aldo Alessandro Cutolo (28 March 1899 – 14 March 1995) was an  Italian academic, television presenter, actor and historian.

Born in Naples, after studying under Benedetto Croce and teaching medieval history at the University of Rome, in 1928 Cutolo was  commissioned to "provide to the direction, the system and the enhancement of the Historical Archive of City of Naples." In 1935 he moved to Milan where he became professor  of Bibliography and Library Science at the University of Milan.

Between 1954 and 1968 he got large popularity as presenter of Una risposta per voi, one of the earliest cultural programs broadcast on Italian television. Author of several books and essays and director of the magazine Historia, Cutolo was also active as a character actor, often alongside Alberto Sordi.

References

External links 

 

1899 births
1995 deaths
Italian medievalists
Mass media people from Naples
Academic staff of the University of Milan
Italian male film actors
Italian television presenters
Academic staff of the Sapienza University of Rome
Italian essayists
Male essayists
20th-century essayists
Italian male non-fiction writers